HSDB may refer to:
Hawaii School for the Deaf and the Blind
Hazardous Substances Data Bank